Gouldbusk is an unincorporated community in Coleman County, Texas, United States. 

Gouldbusk was named for William Gould-Busk, an English rancher who bought the Starkweather ranch around 1886. The town developed after the sale of ranchland for farms in 1903. It became a small center for cotton ginning, and had a post office. In 1940, Gouldbusk had a gin, a post office, six businesses, and 150 residents. However, a decline during and after World War II reduced the population to 70 by 1980. In 2000, its population was still 70.  Gouldbusk has a post office with the ZIP code 76845.

References

Unincorporated communities in Coleman County, Texas
Unincorporated communities in Texas